The Last Butterfly is a 1990 Czech–French holocaust drama film directed by Karel Kachyňa based on the book The Last Butterfly by Canadian author Michael Jacot.

Cast
 Tom Courtenay as Antoine Moreau
 Brigitte Fossey as Věra
 Ingrid Held as Michèle
 Freddie Jones as Conductor Karl Rheinberg
 Milan Kňažko as Commandant Gruber
 Josef Kemr as Leo Stadler
 Drahomíra Fialková as Leo Stadler's wife
 Pavel Bobek as Silberstein
 Josef Laufer as Petersen
 Hana Hegerová as Singer
 Linda Jablonská as Stella

Release
The movie had a premiere in Czechoslovakia in 1991. The film received generally positive reviews. Stephen Holden wrote in New York Times: "The mood of calm despair that hangs over the film lends it a disquietingly surreal aura. But it also plays into the story, which describes an attempt to deliver a horrifying message without stating it in words." David Mills wrote in The Washington Post: "The Last Butterfly demonstrates the precious power of art to transmit emotional truths about history, if not the factual completeness of history."

See also
 Theresienstadt Ghetto and the Red Cross
 Theresienstadt (1944 film)

Bibliography

References

External links
 

1991 films
1991 drama films
1990s English-language films
1990s Czech-language films
Czech war drama films
French war drama films
1990s war drama films
Czech World War II films
Czechoslovak World War II films
French World War II films
Holocaust films
Films about Jews and Judaism
Films set in Czechoslovakia
1990 multilingual films
Czech multilingual films
French multilingual films
Films based on Canadian novels
1990s French films